A dumbwaiter is a small freight elevator or lift intended to carry food.  Dumbwaiters found within modern structures, including both commercial, public and private buildings, are often connected between multiple floors.  When installed in restaurants, schools, hospitals, retirement homes or in private homes, the lifts generally terminate in a kitchen.

The term seems to have been popularized in the United States in the 1840s, after the model of earlier "dumbwaiters" now known as serving trays and lazy Susans. The mechanical dumbwaiter was invented by George W. Cannon, a New York City inventor. He first filed for the patent of a brake system (US Patent no. 260776) that could be used for a dumbwaiter on January 6, 1883.<ref name=JROC> Limited Preview, Google Books', accessed October 30, 2012.</ref> He later filed for the patent on the mechanical dumbwaiter (US Patent No. 361268) on February 17, 1887. He reportedly generated vast royalties from the patents until his death in 1897.

Description

A simple dumbwaiter is a movable frame in a shaft, dropped by a rope on a pulley, guided by rails; most dumbwaiters have a shaft, cart, and capacity smaller than those of passenger elevators, usually 45 to 450 kg (100 to 992 lbs.) Before electric motors were added in the 1920s, dumbwaiters were controlled manually by ropes on pulleys.

Early 20th-century building codes sometimes required fireproof dumbwaiter walls and self-closing fireproof doors and mention features such as buttons to control movement between floors and locks on doors preventing them from opening unless the cart is stopped at that floor.
Dumbwaiter lifts in London were extremely popular in the houses of the rich and privileged. Maids would use them to deliver laundry to the laundry room from different rooms in the house. This obviated carrying dirty washing through the house, saving time and preventing injury.

A legal complaint about a Manhattan restaurant's dumbwaiter in 1915, which also mentions that food orders are shouted up and down the shaft, describes its operation and limitations as follows:
[There is] ... great play between the cart of the dumb-waiter and the guides on which it runs, with the result that the running of the cart is accompanied by a loud noise. The rope which operates the cart of the dumb-waiter runs in a wheel with a very shallow groove, so that the rope is liable to and does at times slip off. ... The cart has no shock absorbers at the top, so that when it strikes the top of the shaft or wheel there is a loud report. ... [T]he ropes of the dumb-waiter strike such wall at frequent intervals with a loud report. ... [T]he dumb-waiter is often negligently operated, by running it faster than necessary, and by letting it go down with a sudden fall.

More recent dumbwaiters can be more sophisticated, using electric motors, automatic control systems, and custom freight containers of other kinds of elevators. Recently constructed book lifts in libraries and mail or other freight transports in office towers may be larger than many dumbwaiters in public restaurants and private homes, supporting loads as heavy as 450 kg (1000 lbs).

Regulations governing construction and operation
Building codes have regulated the construction and operation of dumbwaiters in parts of North America since the 19th century. Modern dumbwaiters in the United States and Canada must comply with American Society of Mechanical Engineers (ASME) codes and, therefore, have features similar to those of passenger elevators.  The construction, operation and usage of dumbwaiters varies widely according to country.

In history

Margaret Bayard Smith wrote that former U.S. President Thomas Jefferson had kept dumbwaiters at both the White House and his Monticello estate whenever she visited him at both places. Smith also wrote that these dumbwaiters were built to reduce the number of servants who could be near dining rooms, thus having more privacy in conversations which at times contained sensitive information which could have been leaked outside the White House. After defecting from the Soviet underground in 1938, Whittaker Chambers gave a last stash of stolen documents to his nephew-in-law, Nathan Levine, who hid them in a dumbwaiter in his mother's house in Brooklyn.  A decade later, Chambers asked his nephew to retrieve them (which Chambers referred to as his "life preserver").  Handwritten and typewritten papers therein came from Alger Hiss and Harry Dexter White (and became known as the "Baltimore Documents").  Microfilm contained therein was subpoenaed and sensationalized (misnamed the "Pumpkin Papers" in the press) by  Richard M Nixon for HUAC.

In popular culture
In "The Honeymooners" Lost Episode "One Big Happy Family" (shown on April 9, 1955). In this episode, both the Kramdens and Nortons decide to share an apartment in order to save on living expenses. Matters, however, did not go well as anticipated.

In Harold Pinter's 1960 play The Dumb Waiter, a dumbwaiter forms a key element.

In Season 3, Episode 13 of Hogan's Heroes, Cpl. LeBeau (Robert Clary) uses a dumbwaiter to access a German banquet room and steal valuable information ahead of a planned explosion.

In Season 3, Episode 2 of The Simpsons, a talking statue of Thomas Jefferson tells Lisa the dumbwaiter is one of his important life accomplishments.

In the movie Home Alone 3, Alex Pruitt played by Alex D. Linz uses a dumbwaiter in his home to escape his home and against the criminals trying to catch him.

In season 6, episode 12 of King of Queens (2004), in a flashback, Doug wants to buy a house with a conversation pit and a dumbwaiter.

In Season 2, Episode 6 of Brooklyn Nine-Nine, the evidence against the defendant of a criminal trial related to a diamond heist is found in his apartment's dumbwaiter.

 In The 2003 movie Duplex, a dumbwaiter is used to illegally access an upstairs apartment.

 In the 2005 movie Zathura: A Space Adventure, a dumbwaiter is used by Danny to hide from the Zorgons.

 In the 2012 version of Littlest Pet Shop, the main character, Blythe Baxter, uses a dumbwaiter to travel between her room and the titular pet shop located below her apartment.

 In Season 10, Episode 25 of Cheers, An Old-Fashioned Wedding, a dumbwaiter is featured throughout the episode. Kelly, wearing a wedding dress, uses it to hide from her father. Carla rides (and is dropped) in it with a dead minister.

 On "Laverne & Shirley", Laverne DeFazio and Shirley Feeney communicate with upstairs neighbors Leonard "Lenny" Kosnowski and Andrew "Squiggy" Squiggman by screaming up the dumbwaiter shaft connecting their apartments.
 In the 2022 Netflix series, The Watcher'', the protagonists buy an old house which includes a dumbwaiter. The dumbwaiter is a key aspect to the show and has many situations centered around it.

Gallery

See also
Freight elevator

References

External links

Building engineering
Elevators